Scaphiophryne madagascariensis is a species of frog in the family Microhylidae. It is endemic to Madagascar. Its natural habitats are subtropical or tropical moist montane forests, moist savanna, subtropical or tropical high-altitude grassland, freshwater marshes, intermittent freshwater marshes, arable land, and rural gardens. It is threatened by habitat loss.

References

Scaphiophryne
Endemic frogs of Madagascar
Taxonomy articles created by Polbot
Amphibians described in 1882